King's High School is a state single-sex boys' secondary school in Dunedin, New Zealand. It is located at the southern end of the city close to the boundary between the suburbs of South Dunedin, St. Clair and Forbury, next to the parallel single-sex girls' school, Queen's High School. Both schools share several facilities, including the multimillion-dollar Performing Arts Centre which opened in 2006.

History
The school first opened in 1936, and held its 75th anniversary in late 2010.

In 2011, the school had the highest National Certificate of Educational Achievement (NCEA) pass rates for state boys' schools in New Zealand. Among the results, the level one score averaged at 93.4% (a significant increase from 71% in 2008). In 2017, NCEA pass rates continued to be above the national average, with NCEA Level One averaging 96.6%, and Level Three averaging 90.0%.

King's had 722 pupils in 2007, growing to 1,008 pupils in 2014, the highest roll in King's 78-year history. The size of the roll also meant that King's became the largest school in the Otago region, overtaking Taieri College in the process. Since then, student numbers have remained steady, measuring 1,041 students in 2018.

In mid February 2021, King's High School attracted significant domestic media attention after a 16 year old African-American student named Lewis O'Malley-Scott was told that he could not wear cornrows by Rector Nick McIvor. His parents and older sister objected to the cornrow ban, describing it as racist, discriminatory, and ignoring its cultural significance to African Americans. McIvor initially defended the cornrow ban as part of Kings' uniform policy. In response to media and public interest, McIvor amended Kings' uniform policy to recognise cultural needs when students' hairstyles were considered; allowing O'Malley Scott to wear his cornrows while attending the school.

Facilities

King's High School was re-built across almost a decade in the mid-1990s. The school has separate sports facilities, a purpose-built catering suite and performing arts centre. The school also has a camp and classroom off-site in Warrington, north of Dunedin, which students in year nine visit for their school camp.

In 2006, King's High School (along with Queen's) added a multimillion-dollar performing arts centre, with a capacity of almost 500. The facility is used by both schools, and the surrounding community. In 2010, renovations were made to the schools gymnasium. Later in 2018, renovations took place in the art department with plans for additional upgrading.

House system

New students to King's are placed into one of four houses – Tudor, Windsor, Stuart or Hanover, based on the Historic English royal houses. Throughout the year, juniors and seniors compete in many sports, cultural and performance based activities. In term four, the house with the most points wins the 'House shield'. 
Some events include: rugby sevens, football, basketball, athletics, cross country, softball, singing, haka competition, debating and chess. Athletics, Cross Country, Singing and the haka competition are all full school, compulsory events worth double house points. All other interhouse events are optional and done at lunchtime.

Extracurricular activities

King's has many extramural competitions with Southland Boys' High School, Otago Boys' High School, Waitaki Boys' High School and Shirley Boys' High School. Since the opening of the performing arts center in 2006, King's and Queen's have staged several musicals.

Notable alumni

The arts
 James K. Baxter – poet and social critic
 Tony Ballantyne – author and historian
 Barry Cleavin - artist
 Christopher de Hamel - academic librarian, historian and writer
 Grahame Sydney – painter
 Riki Gooch – musician (TrinityRoots)

Broadcasting and media
 Murray Deaker – radio and television sports show host
 Peter Montgomery – yachting commentator
 Ian Templeton – political journalist

Public service
 David Benson-Pope – politician
 Warren Cooper – politician
 Grant Robertson – politician

Sport
 Tony Brown – rugby union player
 Glen Denham – basketballer
 Carl Hayman – rugby union player
 Chris Laidlaw – rugby union player, diplomat, politician, broadcaster, author
 Warren Lees – cricket player and coach
 Laurie Mains – rugby union player and coach
 Brendon McCullum – cricketer
 Nathan McCullum – cricketer
 Joe McDonnell – rugby union player
 Paul Miller – rugby union player
 Ken Rutherford – cricketer
 Brad Scott – cricketer
 Ben Smith – rugby union player
 Kupu Vanisi – rugby union player
 Tom Willis – rugby union player
 Uili Kolo'ofai – rugby union player

Rector list

 Dudley Chisholm (1936–1947)
 Bill Lang (1948–1961)
 Harry Craig (1962–1966)
 Jack Bremner (1966–1981)
 Ian Simpson (1982–1997)
 Lindsay James (LJ) Hocking (1997–2001) 
 Colin Donald (2001–2008)
 Dan Reddiex (2008–2019)
 Nick McIvor (2019–present)

Notes

Boys' schools in New Zealand
Educational institutions established in 1936
Secondary schools in Dunedin
1936 establishments in New Zealand